The Billabong Pipeline Masters is an event in surfing held annually at Banzai Pipeline in  Oahu, Hawaii. It was established in 1971, and has been sponsored by Billabong since 2007.

The event attracts the top 34 surfers from The World Surf League (WSL) as well as 32 surfers who compete in walk-on trials. The event is the final leg of the Triple Crown of Surfing and the final event on the WSL Championship Tour, except in 2020, when the COVID-19 pandemic eliminated the 2020 calendar season, with the December Pipeline Masters serving as the opening event of a 2020–21 competition season. It also served as the opening event for the 2022 season

Winners

References

External links
 

Big wave surfing
Surfing competitions in Hawaii
Surfing in Hawaii
Annual events in Hawaii
Recurring sporting events established in 1971
1971 establishments in Hawaii